"All Stand Up (Never Say Never)" is a single released by the British rock band Status Quo in 2002. It was included on the album Heavy Traffic.

Track listing 
 "All Stand Up (Never Say Never)" (single edit) (Rossi/Young) 3.44
 "You Let Me Down" (Rossi/Young) 5.01
 "All Stand Up (Never Say Never)" CD-rom video (Taken from The One and Only TV performance)

Charts

References 

Status Quo (band) songs
2002 singles
Songs written by Francis Rossi
Songs written by Bob Young (musician)
2002 songs